The 2019 Missouri Valley Conference men's soccer season was the 29th season of men's varsity soccer in the conference. The season began in late August 2019 and concluded in mid-November 2019.

Changes from 2018 
Central Arkansas left the Missouri Valley Conference as an affiliate member to become an affiliate member of the Sun Belt Conference.

Teams

Preseason

Preseason poll 
The preseason poll was released on August 15, 2019. Missouri State was picked to win the MVC championship.

Preseason national polls 
The preseason national polls will be released in July and August 2019.

Preseason all-MVC team 
To be announced in August 2019.

Regular season

Early season tournaments 

Early season tournaments will be announced in late Spring and Summer 2019.

Conference results 
Each team plays every other conference team twice; once home and once away.

Rankings

National rankings

Regional rankings — United Soccer West Region 

The United Soccer West Region for 2019 compares teams across the Missouri Valley, WCC, and Summit League.

NCAA RPI Rankings

Players of the Week

Postseason

MVC Tournament

NCAA Tournament 

Two teams from the MVC were selected to the NCAA Tournament: the regular season champions, Missouri State, and the tournament champions, Loyola Chicago. Neither team was given a second round bye. Missouri State was selected to host a first round matchup. In the NCAA Tournament, Missouri State beat Denver in the first round before losing to the ninth-seeded UCF in the second round. Loyola Chicago lost their first round matchup to Kentucky in the opening round.

Postseason awards and honors

2020 MLS Draft

The 2020 MLS SuperDraft was held on January 9 and 13 2020. Two players from the conference were drafted.

Homegrown players 

The Homegrown Player Rule is a Major League Soccer program that allows MLS teams to sign local players from their own development academies directly to MLS first team rosters. Before the creation of the rule in 2008, every player entering Major League Soccer had to be assigned through one of the existing MLS player allocation processes, such as the MLS SuperDraft.

To place a player on its homegrown player list, making him eligible to sign as a homegrown player, players must have resided in that club's home territory and participated in the club's youth development system for at least one year. Players can play college soccer and still be eligible to sign a homegrown contract.

References

External links 
 MVC Soccer

 
2019 NCAA Division I men's soccer season